018 may refer to

Air Canada Flight 018, an airline flight from Hong Kong to Vancouver, Canada, illegally boarded by a Chinese man wearing a disguise in 2010
Area code 018, a telephone area code in Uppsala, Sweden
BMW 018, an experimental turbojet engine produced in Germany during the Second World War 1940–1944
Tyrrell 018, a Formula One racing car 1989–1990
Xfone 018, a cellular telephone and internet service company in Israel founded in 2000
 018, the international call prefix for the Xfone 018 provider in telephone numbers in Israel

See also 

 
 O18 (disambiguation) (using the letter 'O' rather than a zero)
 18 (disambiguation)